Greed Corp is a turn-based strategy video game developed by W!Games.

Gameplay
Greed Corp is a turn-based game involving strategic battles on a map featuring a land collapsing mechanic. Players choose one of four factions (Freemen, Pirates, Cartel, Empire) in matches of around 20 minutes. The game also features a single player campaign for each faction.

Players gain credits at the start of their turn and through harvesting layers of land. Built harvesters will slowly destroy the tile they are on and in the area around them. When players harvest too much, the playing field starts to crumble, making depleted tiles collapse.  Tactics involve understanding the offensive value of a harvester as well, using it as a weapon and strategically causing destruction to both opponent and playing field.

Credits may be spent on:
 Harvesters, in order to gain more credits and destroy nearby land
 Armories, in which to build troops
 Troops, in order to claim land, and attack other troops
 Cannons and ammo, in order to shoot nearby enemies
 Transporters, in order to send troops to attack from a distance

Factions
While the four factions are completely identical in terms of gameplay, each faction has its own visual style and role in the campaigns.

 The Freemen are a tribal society with great respect for their environment. Freemen units and buildings are made of wood and other natural materials, and consist primarily of cylindrical shapes. Tiles controlled by the Freemen appear to be covered in farm land, and their harvesters take the form of windmills.
 The Pirates are, as their name suggests, pirates who make a living by stealing from others, but also by trading with the Cartel and the Empire. Their units and buildings appear to be built from scrap metal, and are rather angular in shape. Tiles controlled by the Pirates turn into arid deserts, and their harvesters are shaped like walking construction hoes.
 The Cartel is a group of ruthless corporations whose only interest lies in mining the world's resources for profit. The design of their units and buildings relies heavily on spherical shapes and reddish metals, such as copper. Their tiles turn into cobbled ruddy roads, and they use oil derricks as harvesters.
 The Empire is the most heavily industrialized and militarized nation in the world of Greed Corp, and is constantly at war with the Cartel. Their units, buildings, and even the tiles they control appear to be made of steel.

Reception

Greed Corp received "generally favorable reviews" on all platforms according to the review aggregation website Metacritic.

References

External links
Official site 

2010 video games
Android (operating system) games
IOS games
Linux games
MacOS games
Multiplayer and single-player video games
PlayStation 3 games
PlayStation Network games
Steampunk video games
Turn-based strategy video games
Valcon Games games
Video games developed in the Netherlands
Windows games
Xbox 360 Live Arcade games